Leslie Pierce Holt (born January 1, 1962) is an American former professional football player who was a defensive lineman for the San Francisco 49ers and Atlanta Falcons of the National Football League (NFL) from 1988 to 1995. Holt played high school football at Lamar Consolidated High School in Rosenberg, Texas and played college football at Angelo State University. He was then selected by the 49ers in the second round of the 1988 NFL Draft. Holt was selected to his one and only Pro Bowl in 1992, his last year in San Francisco. He won 2 Super Bowls with the 49ers. The following year in March, Holt signed with the Atlanta Falcons for three years worth $7.5 million.  He lives with his wife, Deana, in Christoval, Texas.

References

External links
 
 

1962 births
Living people
American football defensive ends
American football defensive tackles
Angelo State Rams football coaches
Angelo State Rams football players
Atlanta Falcons players
San Francisco 49ers players
College Football Hall of Fame inductees
National Conference Pro Bowl players
People from Marlin, Texas
People from Rosenberg, Texas
Coaches of American football from Texas
Players of American football from Texas